Géo-Charles real name Charles Louis Proper Guyot (March 22, 1892 – July 7, 1963) was a French poet. In 1924 he won a gold medal in the art competitions of the Olympic Games for his "Jeux Olympiques" ("The Olympic Games").

See also
 Musée Géo-Charles

References

Further reading
 Géo-Charles, un poète de la vie moderne, René Bourgeois, éditions Galerie-Musée Géo-Charles, 1985

External links
 IdRef
 profile

1892 births
1963 deaths
Olympic gold medalists in art competitions
French male poets
20th-century French poets
Medalists at the 1924 Summer Olympics
20th-century French male writers
Olympic competitors in art competitions
French military personnel of World War I